Hot springs, Pachia is a hot spring in Tacna, Peru.
It's located 22.8 km away from Tacna to the east, placed on the shores of the Caplina River, and 1,400m above sea level.

It believed that this hot spring affects people suffering from neuro-arthritic and skin disorders.

The temperatures fluctuate between 36C (96.8F) and 39C (102.2F).

There is a hotel and a restaurant beside the hot spring.

Access
You can go to the hot spring via Pocollay, Calana, and Pachia by local bus.

References
Notes

Further reading

 

Bodies of water of Peru
Landforms of Tacna Region
Hot springs of South America